Slavery in Latin America was an economic and social institution that existed in Latin America from before the colonial era until its legal abolition in the newly independent states during the 19th century. However, it continued illegally in some regions into the 20th century. Slavery in Latin America began in the pre-colonial period when indigenous civilizations, including the Maya and Aztec, enslaved captives taken in war. After the conquest of Latin America by the Spanish and Portuguese, of the nearly 12 million slaves that were shipped across the Atlantic, over 4 million enslaved Africans were brought to Latin America. Roughly 3.5 million of those slaves were brought to Brazil.

After the gradual emancipation of most black slaves, slavery continued along the Pacific coast of South America throughout the 19th century. Peruvian slave traders kidnapped Polynesians, primarily from the Marquesas Islands and Easter Island, and forced them to perform physical labour in mines and the guano industry of Peru and Chile.

Enslavement of the peoples of the Americas: the encomienda system
Encomienda was a labor system in Spain and its empire. It rewarded invaders with the labor of particular groups of subject people. It was first established in Spain during the Roman period but was also used following the Christian conquest of Muslim territories. It was applied on a much larger scale during Spanish colonization of the Americas and the Philippines. Subject people were considered vassals of the Spanish monarch. The Crown awarded an encomienda as a grant to a particular individual. In the conquest era of the sixteenth century, the grants were considered to be a monopoly on the labor of particular groups of Indians, held in perpetuity by the grant holder, called the encomendero, and his descendants.

With the ouster of Christopher Columbus, the Spanish crown sent a royal governor, Fray Nicolás de Ovando, who established the formal encomienda system. In many cases, Native Americans were forced to do hard labor and subjected to extreme punishment and death if they resisted. One conquistador, Bartolome de las Casas, was sent to the Caribbean to conquer the land in the name of the Spanish crown. He was rewarded with an encomienda for the effort he gave in honor of the crown, but after years of seeing the poor treatment of indigenous people, he refused to allow such treatment to continue. Las Casas sailed back to Spain, asking King Ferdinand and his wife Isabella to ban Indigenous slavery. In return, he suggested the use of African slaves for the hard labor of the new farmlands in the Caribbean, as they had been enslaving their own in a continent-wide system since 700AD. By this time, the Spanish had already been using African slaves bought from African Slaving Empires for some of their hard labor in Europe. Due to the persuasion of Las Casas, Queen Isabella of Castle forbade Indian slavery and deemed the indigenous to be "free vassals of the crown". Las Casas expanded on the issue in the famous Valladolid debate. Various versions of the Leyes de Indias, or Laws of the Indies, from 1512 onwards attempted to regulate the interactions between the settlers and natives. The natives continued to fight wars for their improved treatment for hundreds of years. Both natives and Spaniards appealed to the Real Audiencias for relief under the encomienda system. This caused a greater divide between the Spanish and the lower classes of the indigenous people. According to the new laws set in place by the Spanish crown, the indigenous people gained some status, albeit still lower than Spanish citizens.  This allowed the Spanish to maintain control over the indigenous people by allowing them to assume they would have some power coming from these new laws. However, these laws only tricked the indigenous people into agreeing to the encomienda system. They were allowed to live a more 'civilized' life among the Spanish but were under the impression they would eventually gain the ability to own land for themselves, which was never the intention of the Spanish citizens. 

The encomienda system brought many indigenous Taíno to work in the fields and mines in exchange for Spanish protection, education, and a seasonal salary under the pretense of searching for gold and other materials. Many Spaniards took advantage of the regions now under the control of the laborious Spanish encomenderos to exploit the native population by seizing their land and wealth. It would take some time before the Native Americans revolted against their Spanish oppressors and many military campaigns before Spanish Emperor Charles V abolished the encomienda system as a form of slavery. Raphael Lemkin, coiner of the term genocide, considers Spain's abuses of the Amerindian population in the Americas to constitute cultural and even outright genocide, including the abuses of the Encomienda system. He described slavery as "cultural genocide par excellence," noting that "it is the most effective and thorough method of destroying cultures and de-socializing human beings." He considers colonists guilty due to their failure to halt the abuses of the system despite royal orders. Recent research suggests that the spread of old-world diseases appears to have been aggravated by the extreme climatic conditions of the time and by the poor living conditions and harsh treatment of the native people under the encomienda system of New Spain. The primary death driver was work conditions that made any acquired sickness a death sentence, as workflow was expected to be maintained.

Enslaved Africans in Latin America

the African influence on Latin American culture is deeply rooted and can be seen in various aspects such as music, dance, religion, and cuisine. Despite the harsh conditions of slavery, African slaves were able to preserve their cultural traditions. By the first decades of the sixteenth century, they were commonly participating in Spain's military expeditions.

Because most slaves were baptized upon arrival to the New World, the Catholic Church did come to the defense of slaves.  The Catholic Church accepted Africans as God's children, which is what led to the slaves being baptized. The Catholic Church mandated marriage between slaves in Latin America.  This treatment of slaves differs greatly from the United States' treatment of slaves because, in the United States, marriage between slaves was outlawed.  Despite owning slaves, the Catholic Church never embraced the racist justifications for slavery so common among Protestant denominations in the United States. However, the Church was far more willing to speak out against the enslavement of native peoples. People like Bartolome de las Casas were the driving forces for having Indian slavery abolished because they were fearful of the drastic decline of the native population.  The Church did not speak out against African slavery in Latin America in quite the same way. 

The impact of slavery on culture is incredibly apparent in Latin America.  The mixing of cultures and races provides the region with a rich history

New Spain

Between 1502 and 1866, of the 11.2 million Africans taken, only 388,000 arrived in North America. The rest went to Brazil, the European colonies in the Caribbean and Spanish territories in Central and South America, in that order. These slaves were brought as early as the 16th and 17th centuries. The slaves would be forced to work in mines and on plantations. Today, most African communities live in coastal areas such as Vera Cruz on the Gulf of Mexico and the Costa Chica region on the Pacific".

Atlantic slave trade 

During the entire period of the Atlantic Slave Trade, from the sixteenth to the nineteenth centuries, in which slavery existed in the Americas, Brazil was responsible for importing 35 per cent of the slaves from Africa (4 million) while Spanish America imported about 20 per cent (2.5 million). These numbers are significantly higher than the number of slaves imported to the United States (less than 5 per cent). High death rates, an enormous number of runaway slaves and greater levels of granting slave freedom, called manumission, meant that Latin America and Caribbean societies had fewer slaves than the United States at any given time. However, they made up a higher percentage of the population throughout the colonial period. As a result of this higher percentage, the upper class of these societies constantly feared an uprising among not only slaves but Indians and the poor of all racial and ethnic groups.

It was the capital of European merchants, rather than European states, which allowed the Atlantic Slave Trade to take shape in the early sixteenth century. For example, in exchange for granting loans in support of Charles V's election as Holy Roman Emperor in 1519, the German Welser trading house was given immense privileges in the Americas by the Spanish crown, including a license to trade enslaved Africans. Over the next two decades, many other European merchants would pay the Spanish crown for the right to import Africans as slaves to the Americas, further enmeshing unfree labor as a key factor in the colonial Latin American economy. Into the eighteenth century, even as American elites began to take a role in the Atlantic trade, European-based traders remained at the heart of the slave trade. Lisbon-based traders, especially, were key to the continuation of the slave trade to Brazil in the 1700s because new forms of credit there allowed for even larger and more profitable slave voyages than had been possible before.

Slavery in practice 
Over 70 per cent of slaves in Latin America worked on sugar cane plantations due to the importance of this crop to the economies there at the time. Slaves also worked in the production of tobacco, rice, cotton, fruit, corn and other commodities. The majority of slaves brought to the Americas from Africa were men due to the fact plantation owners needed strength for the physical labor that was done in the fields. However, women were brought to the Caribbean islands to provide labor as well. Female slaves were often responsible for cutting cane, fertilizing plants, feeding cane stalks in mill grinders, tending garden vegetables and looking after children. Men cut cane and worked in mills. They also worked as carpenters, blacksmiths, drivers, etc. In some cases, they were even part of the plantation's militia.

Notably, despite mining's immense importance to the colonial economy, African slaves were rarely forced to work in the mines. This was partially due to the glut of Indians, both enslaved and free, who were available to work in the mines. Through practices such as encomienda, the repartimento and mita labor drafts and later, wage labor, Spanish colonial authorities were able to compel Indians to participate in the backbreaking labor of the silver mines. Specifically because of how labor-intensive and dangerous mining was, it would not have been nearly as profitable for Spanish elites to have forced enslaved Africans to work in the mines. If an Indian were killed or injured and no longer able to work they could be replaced by another Indian without any cost to the mine owners. However, if a slave were killed, or injured and thereby no longer able to work, that would represent a loss of capital to the slaveholder.

Slavery and the Catholic Church 

Slavery was part of the indigenous cultures much before the landfall of the Europeans in America. After the Europeans made landfall in America in 1492, Ferdinand and Isabella saw that, if Spain did not receive from the Pope in regard to the American "Indies" the same authority and permissions that Portugal had received in regard of West Africa, then Spain would be at a disadvantage in making use of her newly discovered territories. Accordingly, Pope Alexander VI was approached and already on 3 May 1493 he issued two bulls on the same day in both of which he extended the identical favors, permissions, etc. granted to the Monarchy of Portugal in respect of West Africa to the Monarchy of Spain in respect of America.....and to reduce their persons into perpetual slavery...wherever they may be.

Although the church was excited by the potential for huge numbers of conversions in the New World, the clergy sent there were often horrified by the methods used by the conquerors, and tensions between church and state in the new lands grew rapidly. The encomienda system of forced or tenured labor, begun in 1503, often amounted to slavery, though it was not full chattel slavery. The Leyes de Burgos (or Laws of Burgos), were issued by Ferdinand II (Catholic) on 27 December 1512 and were the first set of rules created to control relations between the Spaniards and the recently conquered indigenous people, but though intended to improve the treatment of the Indians, they simply legalized and regulated the system of forced Indian labor. During the reign of Charles V, the reformers gained steam, with the Spanish missionary Bartolomé de las Casas as a notable leading advocate. His goal was the abolition of the encomienda system, which forced the Indians to abandon their previous lifestyle and destroyed their culture. His active role in the reform movement earned Las Casas the nickname, "Defender of the Indians". He was able to influence the king, and the fruit of the reformers' labor was the New Laws of 1542. However these provoked a revolt by the conquistadors, led by Gonzalo Pizarro, the half-brother of Francisco Pizarro, and the alarmed government revised them to be much weaker to appease them. Continuing armed indigenous resistance, for example in the Mixtón War (1540–41) and the Chichimeca War of 1550 resulted in the full enslavement of thousands of captives, often out of the control of the Spanish government.

The second Archbishop of Mexico (1551–72), the Dominican Alonso de Montúfar, wrote to the king in 1560 protesting the importation of Africans, and questioning the "justness" of enslaving them. Tomás de Mercado was a theologian and economist of the School of Salamanca who had lived in Mexico and whose 1571 Summa de Tratos y Contratos ("Manual of Deals and Contracts") was scathing about the morality of the enslavement of Africans in practice, though he accepted "just-title" slaves in theory.

Pressure for the end of slavery and forced labor among the indigenous Indians worked to increase the demand for African slaves to do the work instead. Rodrigo de Albornoz, a layman, was a former secretary to Charles V sent as an official to New Spain, who opposed the treatment of the indigenous, though himself importing 150 African slaves. Las Casas also supported the importation of African slaves as preferable to Amerindian forced labor, although he later changed his mind about this.

Slave resistance 
As in any slave society, enslaved people in Latin America resisted their oppressors and often sought to establish their communities outside of Hispanic control. In addition to more passive forms of resistance, such as intentional work slowdowns, the colonial period in Latin America saw the birth of numerous autonomous communities of runaway slaves. In Brazil, where the majority of the enslaved people in Latin America were concentrated, these communities were called mocambos or quilombos, words which came from the Mbundu language which was widely spoken in the regions of Angola from which many of the enslaved people in Brazil were taken. These communities were often located in proximity to population centres or plantations, as they largely relied on activities such as highway theft and raids to sustain themselves. Mocambos were also often assisted by Black people still residing in towns, such as in the city of Salvador, where Black people living in the city aided the residents of a nearby Mocambo by helping them enter the city at night to purchase gunpowder and shot. From what historical evidence is available, it appears that, in most cases, the aims of most Mocambos were not an overthrow of the colonial system, but merely their continued existence outside of white society.

Palmares 

One of the most powerful quilombos in colonial Brazil was the settlement of Palmares, located in the remote captaincy of Pernambuco. Palmares were much longer-lasting than many of the other quilombos in Brazil. Despite continued efforts to destroy it, Palmares survived for almost the entire seventeenth century, until its eventual destruction at the hands of the Portuguese colonial government in 1694a few of its inhabitants were able to hold out for a few more years, but Palmares was reported as "almost extinct" by 1697. At its height, Palmares is said to have had as many as 20,000 inhabitants, although this number is disputed by historians, some of whom argue that the true population of Palmares was closer to 11,000. Like other quilombos, the inhabitants of Palmares did not seek the overthrow of the colonial system. In 1678, faced with increasing military pressure from the Portuguese, the king of Palmares, Ganga Zumba, offered to swear loyalty to the Portuguese Crown in exchange for a recognition of the quilombo's freedom. The Portuguese took Zumba's offer, and then immediately reneged on its terms, continuing their military expeditions against Palmares until its eventual destruction.

Wealthy African-descended women

In New Spain 

Slaveholders, slaves and freed slaves of West and Central African descent were the most watched people in the societies of New Spain, the explanations differ but there is the repetitive correlation between status, family and economic stability that women during this time endured. West and Central African slaves were still prominent in Spanish colonies, however, a rise in societal class was forming: free wealthy West and Central African women, who owned slaves themselves. As status and elegance were a major definer in the Spanish culture, it became apparent what was setting these West  and Central African-descent people apart was how they dressed as opposed to the elegance in fabrics, jewels and other prestige items. Freedom becomes more popular for those descended people, forcing them to figure out how to take care of their families' needs from an economical standpoint and statues was a primary factor in their drive towards wealth. Polonia de Ribas was one of many other famous West and Central African-descended slave-owning women, who challenged the predetermined gender roles of men in the family realm and for free women who were not supposed to obtain these luxuries post-freedom. As a result of the trading that was happening from the Atlantic slave trade, many women took the opportunity to purchase slaves to set up their financial stability but in Polonia's case, she was gifted two slaves following her manumission which helped her immensely. Slaves were easily the most expensive item to purchase during that time, not the equipment or the plantation but the slaves, so imagine how financially detrimental it was if one of their slaves would die. It was said that many women used politics in their slave-owning practices but Polonia's additional financial investments helped further her success in her life and other West and Central African-descent slaveowners. Financial investments like working or owning inns since these Spanish colonies were centred around trade, and loaning money to neighbors but she always kept an official notarial account which accounted for all loans and debts; this is important for historians' research. The women often profited from the doweries that were given to them through the marriage of their husbands, this was another way in which women would be set up with economical status while ensuring a life provided. Slave-owning by women of West and Central African -descent was said to be just a way of supporting their families when no husband was present but it could also have something to do with the lust and the want to be a part of this society that has oppressed them constantly.

In Peru 
As seen in the previous section, the main focus is status in society, post-freedom of enslaved women but in Peru, status is closely correlated to its relationship with clothing because of the power it held in an ethically diverse, slaveholding society. It seems absurd that one would enslave after being enslaved but it was because of the "aesthetic" behind having slaves, the exceptionalism one attains within societal eyes when being an owner of slaves. In Peru, the separation in classes and hierarchies was something that Spaniards did not take lightly because they felt an elite sense of European dominance, which was the focal point in the city of Lima when Spaniards wanted to assert dominance over the way that African-descended women dressed and what their clothing signified. African women whether free or not began to have stipulations on what they were to wear through sumptuary laws enforced by white Limeños, trying to secure that autonomy would not be achieved by their oppressors. These laws allowed for only Spanish and elite women were able to wear elegant clothing, gold, silver, silk and slippers with silver bells on them. These laws targeted slave owners and slaves, making sure that they had that separation in classes. Slaves could not afford to wear clothes like that so they must be stealing, this was the thought process of the Spanish lawmakers. If freed women looked like Spanish women then how would you tell them apart, it was considered trickery and they were scrutinized for it so the solution was to wear wool. As clothing does gain more societal popularity and significance, showing the means/wealth of a person but now in a very public fashion. Slaveowners decided that their slaves needed to be dressed in rich clothing to maintain and articulate this elite presence in what is called livery. For freed African-descent women, they were not supposed to dress like elite Spanish but since they were not the targeted subject, they were able to wear skirts and blouses made of lace.

In Colombia 

In Cartagena, clothing and fashion were also at their prime when trying to distinguish between the elite, freed slaves and slaves, but in this culture. It was because African-descent women were being provocative in the way they dressed so nicely while performing common tasks, whether at home or in public, being referred to as "brash and disruptive." Fear is what drove the Holy Office to perform such intense trials when condemning these women because they did not want their people taking control of them. African-descended women were renounced because of their love magic that correlated with the witch trials that were happening during that time. African women were standing out because they were wealthy, the disruption that was seen as a sin or a distraction was just African women wearing clothes made of materials that only elites were to wear. It did not matter whether or not you were wealthy, this was just an expressive way for enslaved and freed slaves to show their individuality, regardless of another oppressor. "Mostly well-off nonwhite women who could not claim the honorable statues of wealthy Española's still dressed as if they were rich and lived in luxury."  The passing down of these fine clothes and jewels only aided the future generations to continue this stand against oppression.

20th century

Mexico

Although on September 16, 1825, President Guadalupe Victoria, on the occasion of the Independence celebrations, ordered the erection of a stage in front of the Diputación, whose words engraved in wood expressed the right to freedom for slaves, Mexicans, the majority of whom were indigenous people from all parts of the Mexican Republic, continued to be segregated and used as slaves until the end of the Mexican Revolution.

During the deportation of Yaqui under the Porfiriato, the Mexican government established large concentration camps in San Marcos, where the remaining Yaqui families were broken up and segregated. Individuals were then sold into slavery from inside the station and packed into train cars which took them to Veracruz, where they have embarked yet again for the port town of Progreso in the Yucatán. There they were transported to their final destination, the nearby henequen plantations.

By 1908, at least 5,000 Yaqui had been sold into slavery. At Valle Nacional, the enslaved Yaquis worked until they died. While there were occasional escapes, the escapees were far from home and without support or assistance, most of them died of hunger while begging for food on the road out of the valley toward Córdoba.

Many women and children could not withstand the three-week journey over the mountains and their bodies were left by the side of the road. Yaquis, particularly children, were rattled off in train cars to be sold as slaves in this process having one or two die simply in the process of deportation. The deaths were mostly caused by unfettered smallpox epidemics.

On the plantations, the Yaquis were forced to work in the tropical climate of the area from dawn to dusk. Yaqui women were allowed to marry only non-native Chinese workers. Given little food and the workers were beaten if they failed to cut and trim at least 2,000 henequen leaves per day, after which they were then locked up every night. Most of the Yaqui men, women and children sent for slave labor on the plantations died there, with two-thirds of the arrivals dying within a year.

Amazon

The Amazon rubber boom and the associated need for an increasing workforce had a significant negative effect on the indigenous population across Brazil, Peru, Ecuador, and Colombia. As rubber plantations grew, labor shortages increased. The owners of the plantations or rubber barons were rich, but those who collected the rubber made very little, due to a large amount of rubber that was needed to be profitable. The rubber barons rounded up all the Indians and forced them to tap rubber out of the trees. One plantation started with 50,000 Indians, but when discovered, only 8,000 were still alive. Slavery and systematic brutality were widespread and in some areas, 90% of the Indian population was wiped out. These rubber plantations were part of the Brazilian rubber market, which declined as rubber plantations in Southeast Asia became more effective.

Roger Casement, an Irishman traveling the Putumayo region of Peru as a British consul during 1910–1911 documented the abuse, slavery, murder, and use of stocks for torture against the native Indians: "The crimes charged against many men now in the employ of the Peruvian Amazon Company are of the most atrocious kind, including murder, violation, and constant flogging."

According to Wade Davis, author of One River: "The horrendous atrocities that were unleashed on the Indian people of the Amazon during the height of the rubber boom were like nothing that had been seen since the first days of the Spanish Conquest." Rubber had catastrophic effects in parts of Upper Amazonia, but its impact should not be exaggerated nor extrapolated to the whole region. The Putumayo was a particularly horrific case. Many nearby rubber regions were not ruled by physical violence, but by the voluntary compliance implicit in patron-peon relations. Some native peoples benefited financially from their dealings with the white merchants.

Others chose not to participate in the rubber business and stayed away from the main rivers, because tappers worked in near-complete isolation; they were not burdened by overseers and timetables. In Brazil, tappers could and did, adulterate rubber cargoes by adding sand and flour to the rubber "balls", before sending them downriver. Flight into the thicket was a successful survival strategy and because Indians were engaged in credit relations, it was a relatively common practice to vanish and work for other patrons, leaving debts unpaid.

See also
 Freedom of wombs
 Afro-Latino
 Afro-Mexicans
 Blackbirding
 Netto Question

References

Further reading

Aguirre Beltrán, Gonzalo. La población negra de México, 1519-1810. Mexico City: Fuente Cultural 1946.
Aimes, Hubert H.S. A History of Slavery in Cuba, 1511-1868. New York: Octagon Books 1967.
Bennett, Herman Lee. Africans in Colonial Mexico. Bloomington: Indiana University Press 2005.
Blanchard, Peter, Under the flags of freedom : slave soldiers and the wars of independence in Spanish South America. Pittsburgh: University of Pittsburgh Press, c2008.
Bowser, Frederick. The African Slave in Colonial Peru, 1524-1650. Stanford: Stanford University Press 1974.
Carroll, Patrick J. Blacks in Colonial Veracruz: Race, Ethnicity, and Regional Development. Austin: University of Texas Press 1991.
Conrad, Robert Edgar. World of Sorrow: The African Slave Trade to Brazil. Baton Rouge: Louisiana State University Press 1986.
Curtin, Philip. The Atlantic Slave Trade: A Census. Madison: University of Wisconsin Press 1969.
Foner, Laura and Eugene D. Genovese, eds. Slavery in the New World: A Reader in Comparative History. Englewood Cliffs NJ: Prentice Hall 1969.
Flusche, Della and Eugene H. Korth. Forgotten Females: Women of African and Indian Descent in Colonial Chile, 1535-1800. Detroit: B.Ethridge 1983.
Freyre, Gilberto. The Masters and the Slaves: A Study of the Development of Brazilian Civilization. 2nd ed. Trans. Samuel Putnam. New York: Knopf 1966.
Fuente, Alejandro de la. "From Slaves to Citizens? Tannenbaum and the Debates on Slavery, Emancipation, and Race Relations in Latin America," International Labor and Working-Class History 77 no. 1 (2010) 154-73.
Fuente, Alejandro de la. "Slaves and the Creation of Legal Rights in Cuba: Coartación and Papel," Hispanic American Historical Review 87, no. 4 (2007): 659-92.
Geggus, David Patrick. "Slave Resistance in the Spanish Caribbean in the Mid-1790s," in A Turbulent Time: The French Revolutionn and the Greater Caribbean, David Barry Gaspar and David Patrick Geggus. Bloomington: Indiana University Press 1997, pp. 130–55.
Gibbings, Julie. "In the Shadow of Slavery: Historical Time, Labor, and Citizenship in Nineteenth-Century Alta Verapaz, Guatemala," Hispnaic American Historical Review 96.1, (February 2016): 73-107.
Helg, Aline, Liberty and Equality in Caribbean Colombia, 1770-1835. Chapel Hill: University of North Carolina Press 2004.
Heuman, Gad and Trevor Graeme Burnard, eds. The Routledge History of Slavery. New York: Taylor and Francis 2011.
Hünefeldt, Christine. Paying the Price of Freedom: Family and Labor among Lima's Slaves, 1800-1854. Berkeley and Los Angeles: University of California Press 1994.
Johnson, Lyman L. "A Lack of Legitimate Obedience and Respect: Slaves and Their Masters in the Courts of Late Colonial Buenos Aires," Hispanic American Historical Review 87, no. 4 (2007) 631-57.
Klein, Herbert S. The Middle Passage: Comparative Studies in the Atlantic Slave Trade. Princeton: Princeton University Press 1978.
Landers, Jane. Black Society in Spanish Florida. Urbana: University of Illinois Press 1999.
Landers, Jane and Barry Robinson, eds. Slaves, Subjects, and Subversives: Blacks in Colonial Latin America. Albuquerque: University of New Mexico Press 2006.
Love, Edgar F. "Negro Resistance to Spanish Rule in Colonial Mexico," Journal of Negro History 52, no. 2 (April 1967) 89-103.
Martínez, María Elena. "The Black Blood of New Spain: Limpieza de Sangre, Racial Violence, and Gendered Power in Early Colonial Mexico," William and Mary Quarterly 61, no. 3 (July 2004), 479-520.
Restall, Matthew, and Jane Landers, "The African Experience in Early Spanish America," The Americas 57, no. 2 (2000) 167-70.
Mattoso, Katia M. De Queiros. To be a Slave in Brazil, 1550-1888. Trans. Arthur Goldhammer. New Brunswick: Rutgers University Press 1979.
 Miller, Joseph C. Way of Death: Merchant Capitalism and the Angolan Slave Trade, 1730-1830. Madison: University of Wisconsin Press 1988.
Palmer, Colin. Slaves of the White God. Blacks in Mexico 1570-1650. Cambridge: Harvard University Press 1976.
Palmer, Colin. Human Cargoes: The British Slave Trade to Spanish America, 1700-1739. Urbana: University of Illinois Press 1981. 
Rout, Leslie B. The African Experience in Spanish America, 1502 to the Present Day. New York: Cambridge University Press 1976.
Russell-Wood, A. J. R. The Black Man in Slavery and Freedom in Colonial Brazil. New York: St Martin's Press 1982.
Schwartz, Stuart B. Sugar Plantations in the Formation of Brazilian Society: Bahia 1550-1835. Cambridge: Cambridge University Press 1985.
Sharp, William Frederick. Slavery on the Spanish Frontier: The Colombian Chocó, 1680-1810. Norman: University of Oklahoma Press 1976.
Solow, Barard I. ed., Slavery and the Rise of the Atlantic System. Cambridge: Cambridge University Press 1991.
Tannenbaum, Frank. Slave and Citizen: The Negro in the Americas. New York Vintage Books 1947.
Toplin, Robert Brent. Slavery and Race Relations in Latin America. Westport CT: Greenwood Press 1974.
Vinson, Ben, III and Matthew Restall, eds. Black Mexico: Race and Society from Colonial to Modern Times. Albuquerque: University of New Mexico Press 2009.
Walker, Tamara J. "He Outfitted His Family in Notable Decency: Slavery, Honour, and Dress in Eighteenth-Century Lima, Peru," Slavery & Abolition 30, no. 3 (2009) 383-402.

External links 
 Slavery in the Americas

Latin American history
Slavery in North America
Slavery in South America
Slavery by region
Slavery in the Spanish Empire